Osbourne Berrington Fleming (born February 18, 1940) is a politician and a former chief minister of Anguilla. He held that post from March 6, 2000, three days after the Anguilla United Front, a conservative coalition which included Fleming's Anguilla National Alliance won parliamentary elections, gaining at least 4 of the 7 seats, until February 15, 2010 in which he retired from his seat as the chief minister of Anguilla.  Mr. Fleming was a prominent and successful businessman prior to entering politics.  He served for many years as Minister of Finance before winning election as Anguilla's Chief Minister.

See also

 List of Chief Ministers of Anguilla

References

External links

 Osbourne Fleming at caribbeanelections.com

1940 births
Living people
Chief Ministers of Anguilla
Anguilla National Alliance politicians
Finance ministers